Hans Henrik Jæger (2 September 1854, Drammen, Norway – 8 February 1910, Oslo) was a Norwegian writer, philosopher and anarchist political activist who was part of the Oslo (then Kristiania)-based bohemian group known as the Kristiania Bohemians. He also lost his position as a stenographer at the Parliament of Norway. Jæger was defended in court by barrister Ludvig Meyer. He and other bohemians tried to live by the nine commandments he had formulated in Fra Kristiania-bohêmen.

The following year he was forced to flee Norway.  He had been sentenced to 150 more days in prison after the Norwegian government learned that he had sent 300 copies of Fra Kristiania-bohêmen to Sweden under the pretense that it was a volume of Christmas stories.

He was a friend of Edvard Munch and was the subject of one of Munch's paintings, swiftly painted in the rented room of one of Munch's friends.

Hans Jæger maintained that sexuality should be unrestricted in relationships, arguing that the traditional values of marriage and social class encroached on personal freedom and fulfillment. Jæger asserted that the institution of marriage should be abolished and that there should be "full sexual freedom between the sexes in the same social class."

Published works

 Kants fornuftskritik (Kant's critique of pure reason) 1878
 Olga (play) 1883
 En intellektuel Forførelse (play) (An Intellectual Seduction) 1884
 Fra Kristiania-bohêmen (From the Christiania Bohemians) 1885
 Julefortællinger av Hans Jæger (Christmas Stories by Hans Jæger, in reality the second volume of From the Christiania Bohemians) 1886
 Albertine (with Christian Krohg) 1886
 Min forsvarstale i høyesterett (My Defence Speech in the Supreme Court) 1886
 Kristianiabilleder (Images of Christiania) 1888
 Novelletter (Short Stories) 1889
 Bohemens erotiske bekjennelser (The Erotic Confessions of the Bohemians)
 Syk kjærlihet (part 1 of 3) 1893 (Twisted Love)
 Bekjendelser (part 2 of 3) 1902 (Confessions)
 Fængsel og fortvilelse (part 3 of 3) 1903 (Prison and Despair)
 Anarkiets bibel (The Bible of Anarchism) 1906
 Socialismens ABC (written between 1906 and 1910, never finished) (The ABC of Socialism)

References

Biography
 "'Jæger: en rekonstruksjon'', a biography by Ketil Bjørnstad

External links 

 
 Hans Jæger Page at the Anarchist Encyclopedia
 Digitized books by Jæger in the National Library of Norway

1854 births
1910 deaths
Anarchist writers
Censorship in Norway
Edvard Munch
Norwegian anarchists
Norwegian male writers
Norwegian prisoners and detainees
People convicted of blasphemy
Prisoners and detainees of Norway